The Mitsudomoe Islands are three small islands lying close together  west of Strandnebba in the southeastern extremity of Lützow-Holm Bay, Antarctica. They were mapped from surveys and air photos by the Japanese Antarctic Research Expedition, 1957–62, and named "Mitsudomoe-shima" (commas-united-to-form-a-circle islands).

See also 
 List of antarctic and sub-antarctic islands

References

Islands of Queen Maud Land
Prince Harald Coast